Kunimi Andrea (born April 27, 1977) is an American singer, actress, voice over artist and edutainer. Andrea is known for her role as the main singer, actress on a popular children's television show Shimajiro for Playtime for Toddlers.

Early life and career beginnings

Andrea was born in San Francisco, California to a Caucasian American mother Teri Suzanne; her late father was Japanese. She is the older sister of Mayuka Thaïs and have worked on numerous albums together. Andrea started her singing career at the age of 8 and recorded Minna De Merry Christmas from Nippon Columbia.  In 2004, Andrea recorded Genki Genki Utaou Nontan's bilingual Christmas album for Nippon Columbia along with her sister Mayuka Thaïs, and her mother Teri Suzanne. To date, Andrea has worked on countless albums and singles.
 She honed her acting skills for 13 years while studying at the Aoyama Theatre in the round, bilingual Performing Arts Group (P.A.G), at the National Children's Castle's Aoyama Theatre.

Music

Albums

Studio released:

Television

References

External links 

1977 births
Living people
Songwriters from San Francisco
Singers from San Francisco
21st-century American singers
Singer-songwriters from California